Maan de Steenwinkel (born 10 February 1997), also known as simply Maan, is a Dutch singer and actress. De Steenwinkel first came to prominence after winning season six of The Voice of Holland. She has subsequently taken part in the Dutch television series De beste zangers van Nederland and in the Dutch version of Dance Dance Dance.

Life and career
De Steenwinkel was born in Utrecht. The family moved to Bergen, North Holland a year later. Her father Siebe de Steenwinkel is a television director for talk show programmes such as Pauw and De Wereld Draait Door and her mother was a handicraft teacher.  

She attended  in Alkmaar. 

In 2015, de Steenwinkel auditioned for season six of The Voice of Holland, where she was a member of Team Marco. She performed "The Power of Love" in her blind audition, where all four coaches turned their chairs. On 29 January 2016, de Steenwinkel went on to win the competition. Following her win, she released the single "Perfect World", which was certified gold and peaked within the Top 40 in the Netherlands. Her follow-up single, "Ride It", achieved similar levels of success.

In 2017, de Steenwinkel became involved with season ten of De beste zangers van Nederland and season three of Dance Dance Dance. In December, de Steenwinkel was performing live at Radio 538 when a nude streaker ambushed the stage, causing her to burst into tears mid-performance. It was later revealed that the station's DJ Frank Dane initiated the prank, which led to controversy.

In January 2020, she released her debut album .

Filmography

Discography

Extended plays

Singles

Certifications

References

External links

1997 births
Dutch pop singers
Living people
People from Bergen, North Holland
The Voice (franchise) winners
21st-century Dutch singers
21st-century Dutch women singers